Rendezvous is a 1930 German musical film directed by Carl Boese and starring Lucie Englisch, Ralph Arthur Roberts and Alexa Engström. Separate versions were made in French (Love Songs) and Spanish (My Wife's Teacher). Such multi-language versions were common in the early years of sound.

The film's sets were designed by the art director Julius von Borsody.

Cast
 Lucie Englisch as Yvonne
 Ralph Arthur Roberts as Leon
 Alexa Engström as Antoinette
 Walter Rilla as Armand
 S.Z. Sakall as Crepin
 Paul Morgan as Weber, Portier
 Fritz Schulz as Claude
 Margarete Kupfer as Frau Schild - Pianistin
 Trude Lieske as Lulu

References

Bibliography

External links 
 

1930 films
German musical films
1930 musical films
Films of the Weimar Republic
1930s German-language films
Films directed by Carl Boese
German films based on plays
German multilingual films
German black-and-white films
1930 multilingual films
Films with screenplays by Robert Florey
1930s German films